This is a list of Time Team episodes from series 10.

Episode

Series 10

Episode # refers to the air date order. The Time Team Specials are aired in between regular episodes, but are omitted from this list

Notes

References

External links
Time Team at Channel4.com
The Unofficial Time Team site Fan site

Time Team (Series 10)
2003 British television seasons